Large-crested toad is a common name for several amphibians and may refer to:

Incilius cristatus, native to Puebla and Veracruz in Mexico
Incilius macrocristatus, native to Guatemala and Chiapas in Mexico

Incilius
Amphibian common names